Lincoln City Centre is the cultural, economic and historical centre of the city of Lincoln in Lincolnshire, England. The city centre is made up of many historical, contemporary, modern and grade listed buildings. The city centre is home to many historical landmarks such as Lincoln Cathedral, Lincoln Castle, Guildhall and Stonebow and Jews Court among other buildings. The city centre acts as the culture and economical hub for many settlements of Lincolnshire, Nottinghamshire and South Yorkshire.

Places of worship 
The city centre is home to many activeand former churches as well as a purpose built mosque. Notable churches in the city centre include:

 St Swithin's Church, Lincoln

 Alive Church, Lincoln

 St Mary le Wigford 

 St Peter at Gowts

 Central Methodist Church, Lincoln

 St Hugh's Church, Lincoln

 St Benedict's Church, Lincoln

 St Giles Church, Lincoln

 St Katherines Church, Lincoln

Geography
The city centre starts from the top of Steep Hill at the Castle and Cathedral and carries on down a steep gradient until it finishes in the Boultham and St Catherine's suburbs of the city. The city also has shopping centres located on the Birchwood estate, Carlton Centre and The Forum in neighboring North Hykeham as well as the Waterside and St Marks Shopping Centres in the city centre.

Outlying villages and towns such as North Hykeham, Wragby, Saxilby, Skellingthorpe, Washingborough, Waddington, Newark on Trent, Bawtry, Gainsborough, Sleaford, Grantham, Market Rasen, Southwell, Ollerton, Tuxford, Louth and Horncastle act as commuter settlements for the city as these are the closest to the city.

Places of education
The city is home to many educational centres and schools as well as the University of Lincoln, Lincoln College and Access Creative College. Most schools within in the city are owned and operated by the Church of England and there are islamic school lessons in the Central Islamic Mosque of the city.

Transport
The city centre is served by Lincoln Bus Station and Lincoln Central railway station. These provide links to other towns and cities such as Doncaster, Sheffield, Leeds, Newark-on-Trent, Nottingham, York, Manchester and Grimsby among other destinations. The city was served by Lincoln St Marks railway station but this was closed and since been reused as the St Marks Shopping Centre with the original station building still surviving. Interestingly enough to note, the city is one of only a few settlements in the United Kingdom to have a level crossing leading into both the railway station and also on the high street, directly next to the level crossing is also St Mary Le Wigford church.

References

Lincoln, England
Lincolnshire
Lincoln Cathedral